William L. McMillan (January 13, 1936 – August 30, 1984) was an American physicist noted for his research of condensed matter physics.

McMillan was a member of the National Academy of Sciences, Professor of Physics at University of Illinois, Urbana-Champaign.
He was also a member of the American Academy of Arts and Sciences
McMillan received the 1978 Fritz London Memorial Prize for his work in superconductors.
The National Academies Press called him "the ablest condensed matter physicist of his generation".
The University of Illinois established an award in his name: The William L. McMillan Award.

The electron-phonon coupling in superconductors is described by the McMillan parameter.

Life and career 
 1936 born in Little Rock, Arkansas
 1958: BS, University of Arkansas (Electrical Engineering)
 1959: MS, University of Arkansas (Physics)
 1964: PhD, University of Illinois, Urbana-Champaign
 1964–1972: Bell Laboratories, Member, Technical Staff
 1972–1984: University of Illinois, Urbana-Champaign, Professor of Physics
 1978 Fritz London Memorial Prize for his work on superconductors
 1982: elected to National Academy of Sciences
 1983: elected to the American Academy of Arts and Sciences in 1983
 1984: Died of an accident at age 48

References 

1936 births
1984 deaths
20th-century American physicists
University of Illinois Urbana-Champaign faculty
Members of the United States National Academy of Sciences
Scientists at Bell Labs
Fellows of the American Physical Society
Cycling road incident deaths
Road incident deaths in Illinois